Anna Brita Sergel or Anna Sibylla Sergell, later surname Howe (1733–1819), was a Swedish artist (embroidery), an official decorator of the royal Swedish court.

Sergel was the daughter of the embroidery decorator of the royal Swedish court, Christoffer Sergel, and Elisabet Swyrner from Germany. Her sister was the famous artist Johan Tobias Sergel. In 1754, she married the vine-master of the court, Johan Valentin Howe or Hovje (d. 1760).

Sergel was the professional assistant of her father until his death in 1773. After her father's death, she shared the position of official decorator in embroidery of the court with her sister, Maria Sofia. Among the most famous works made by the two sisters, was the interior decoration of the royal Fredrikshov Palace.

References 

Swedish women artists
1733 births
1819 deaths
Swedish textile artists
Embroidery designers
18th-century Swedish artists
Swedish courtiers
Gustavian era people
18th-century women textile artists
18th-century textile artists
19th-century women textile artists
19th-century textile artists